Dendrelaphis pictus (painted bronzeback) is a species of snake found in Southeast Asia and India.

Description
In the painted bronzeback the maxillary teeth number from 23 to 26, the eye is as long as the distance between the nostril and eye. The rostral scale is more broad than deep, and is visible from above. Internasal scales are as long as, or slightly shorter than, the praefrontal scales. The frontal scale is as long as its distance from the rostral or the tip of the snout, but shorter than the parietal scales. The loreal is long and there is one preocular and two postoculars. The temporal scales are 2+2, 1+1, or 1+2. There are nine (seven or eight) upper labials, with the fifth and sixth (or fourth to sixth) entering the eye. This snake has five (four) lower labials in contact with the anterior chin shields the latter shorter than the posterior, which are separated by one anterior and two posterior scales. Scales are in 15 rows, vertebrals about as large as the outer. Ventrals number 151–204, the anal scale is divided, and subcaudals number 103–174.

The snake's colouration is olive or brown above with a yellow lateral stripe, bordered below by a dark line between the outer scales and the ventrals. A black stripe on each side of the head passes through the eye, widens or breaks up into spots, separated by bluish-green bands on the nape. The upper lip is yellow, and the lower surface yellowish or greenish. Length of head and body approximately 740 mm and the tail 440 mm.

Notes

References
 Anderson, J., 1871 On some Indian reptiles. Proc. Zool. Soc., London: pp. 149–211
 Das, I. 1999 Biogeography of the amphibians and reptiles of the Andaman and Nicobar Islands, India. In: Ota, H. (ed) Tropical Island herpetofauna.., Elsevier, pp. 43–77
 Gmelin, Johann Friedrich (1789): [Description of Dendrelaphis pictus]. In: Systema Naturae per regna tria naturae secundum classes, ordines, genera, species, cum characteribus, differentiis, synonymis, locis (13th ed.) 1, part II. Georg Emanuel Beer, Lipsiae [Leipzig]
 How R A.  Schmitt L H.  Maharadatunkamsi. 1996 Geographical variation in the genus Dendrelaphis (Serpentes: Colubridae) within the islands of south-eastern Indonesia. JOURNAL OF ZOOLOGY (LONDON) 238 (2): pp. 351–363.
 Meise, Wilhelm & Hennig, Willi 1932 Die Schlangengattung Dendrophis. Zool. Anz. 99 (11/12): pp. 273–297
 Stejneger, Leonhard 1933 The ophidian generic names Ahaetulla and Dendrophis. Copeia 1933 (4): pp. 199–203

External links
 
 https://web.archive.org/web/20040907175456/http://itgmv1.fzk.de/www/itg/uetz/herp/photos/DENDRELAPHIS_PICTUS.JPG

Colubrids
Snakes of Asia
Snakes of Southeast Asia
Reptiles of India
Reptiles described in 1789
Taxa named by Johann Friedrich Gmelin
pictus